Dicrodon heterolepis, the Ecuador desert tegu , is a species of teiid lizard endemic to coastal Peru.

References

Dicrodon
Reptiles described in 1845
Taxa named by Johann Jakob von Tschudi